The Lyman Viaduct is a buried railroad trestle built over Dickinson Creek in Colchester, Connecticut in 1873. Along with the nearby Rapallo Viaduct, it is one of the few surviving wrought iron railroad trestles from the first generation of such structures. It was built for the Boston and New York Air-Line Railroad, whose successor, the New York, New Haven and Hartford Railroad (NYNH&H), buried it in sand rather than replacing it with a stronger structure. The viaduct was added to the National Register of Historic Places in 1986, since it is capable of providing detailed information about construction methods of the period. The viaduct now carries the multiuse Air Line State Park Trail.

Description and history

The Lyman Viaduct is located in a rural setting of northwestern Colchester. The structure consists of bents formed out of three quarter-round rolled wrought iron sections, with flanges designed to facilitate riveted assembly. At the point of the stream crossing, there are four  columns. Each tier of the trestle is joined horizontally and laterally to adjacent members. The entire structure is buried in earthen fill and topped by a dense pack of cinder blocks, now somewhat overgrown on the sides.

The viaduct was built in 1873 by the Phoenix Iron Works for the Boston and New York Air-Line Railroad, which aimed to provide service between New York City and Boston, Massachusetts via Middletown, Connecticut. The viaduct was one of the largest single capital expenses of the railroad venture, which was beset by cost overruns and failed after just ten years of operation. Taken over by the NYNH&H, the viaduct was filled as a comparatively inexpensive means of strengthening the structure for use by heavier equipment in the early 20th century. The line remained in operation into the 1960s, and has since been adapted as the multiuse Air Line Trail by the state.

This trestle and the nearby Rapallo Viaduct, which was similarly buried, were among the world's first examples of wrought iron railroad trestles, and are the only known ones of that period that are believed to be in good condition, due to their entombment. The only earlier known examples of this technology include the Verrugas Bridge in Peru, begun before these, completed in 1873, and washed away in 1889, and the Kinzua Bridge in Pennsylvania, later rebuilt in steel. Because records of its construction are incomplete, forensic analysis of the structure (for example, by excavating a portion of the embankment) is expected to provide significant information about its design and construction, in particular how its construction may have deviated from known plans.

See also

National Register of Historic Places listings in New London County, Connecticut
List of bridges on the National Register of Historic Places in Connecticut

References

Bridges completed in 1873
Railroad bridges on the National Register of Historic Places in Connecticut
Bridges in New London County, Connecticut
Colchester, Connecticut
New York, New Haven and Hartford Railroad bridges
Railroad bridges in Connecticut
Truss bridges in the United States
Viaducts in the United States
National Register of Historic Places in New London County, Connecticut
Wrought iron bridges in the United States
Trestle bridges in the United States
Buried viaducts